Sidney Center is a hamlet in Delaware County, New York, United States. Sidney Center has a post office with ZIP code 13839, which opened on March 29, 1839.

References

Hamlets in Delaware County, New York
Hamlets in New York (state)